On 16 August 2015, two suspected suicide bombers detonated explosives at the home office of Punjab Interior Minister Shuja Khanzada in the Attock District village of Shadikhan,  from the Pakistani capital of Islamabad. The blasts killed the minister and 18 other people; at least 17 people were injured and taken to hospitals. Lashkar-e-Jhangvi (LeJ), a Deobandi militant group with ties to Al-Qaeda, claimed responsibility for the attack, and it was later determined that Tehrik-i-Taliban Pakistan was also involved.

Attack
On Sunday, 16 August 2015, 71-year-old Shuja Khanzada was meeting with relatives and friends at his home office in the village of  Shadikhan to condole the death of a relative who had died in the United Kingdom, when the attack was perpetrated by two men strapped with a combined  of explosives. According to the initial investigation, the bombers' intent was to collapse the building. The first bomber entered Khanzada's home office, shook his hand and detonated the device while standing next to one of the pillars on the veranda. It is believed a second bomber, standing on the street next to the building, then detonated his explosives, causing the building to collapse when the roof of the house caved in, trapping an unknown number of people under the rubble.

Investigation
According to a preliminary investigation, the attack may have been retaliation for the killing of Lashkar-e-Jhangvi militant leader Malik Ishaq by the Punjab Police. Later investigation by the Counter Terrorism Department (CTD) of the Punjab Police and Inter-Services Intelligence determined that the terrorist group Tehrik-i-Taliban Pakistan was also involved. On 1 October, CTD raided a house in Iqbal Town, Lahore, killing four people suspected of being involved in the bombing.

In September 2015, one suspect, Qasim Muavia, was arrested. Two years later in August 2017, the Punjab government transferred his trial to military court, stating that civilian court was taking too long. An additional suspect was arrested in March 2016, and in October 2017, one more suspect was killed during a confrontation with police.

The attack was strongly condemned throughout the country, including by Prime Minister Nawaz Sharif and Chief of Army Staff General Raheel Shareef.

International reactions
The attack was condemned by international leaders, including United Nations Secretary-General Ban Ki-moon, who called for justice against those who planned the attack.

The United States also condemned the attack and offered to assist with the investigation. The U.S. Embassy in Islamabad issued a statement, saying, "We support Pakistan's determination to bring to justice those behind the attack and are prepared to provide assistance, if requested, to government authorities investigating this reprehensible act."

See also
 Targeted killings in Pakistan
 Terrorist incidents in Pakistan in 2015
 List of terrorist incidents, 2015

References 

2015 murders in Pakistan
21st-century mass murder in Pakistan
2015 murders in Asia
Attacks in Pakistan in 2015
Attock District
August 2015 crimes in Asia
August 2015 events in Pakistan
Islamic terrorist incidents in 2015
Mass murder in 2015
Terrorist incidents in Pakistan in 2015
Explosions in 2015
Assassinations in Pakistan